Railton is a surname. Notable people with the surname include:

David Railton (1884–1955), Church of England clergyman, a military chaplain and the originator of the idea of the tomb of The Unknown Warrior
Dennis Railton (born 1940), Australian rules footballer
George Scott Railton (1849–1913), Salvation Army Commissioner and second in command after General William Booth
Herbert Railton (1857–1910), English artist and illustrator
Mary Railton (1906–1992), British army officer
Nathaniel Railton (1886–1948), British Anglican archdeacon
Peter Railton (born 1950), American philosopher
Reid Railton (1895–1977), British automotive engineer
Richard Railton, 16th-century English politician
Ruth Railton (1915–2001), British music director and composer
William Railton (1800–1877), English architect who designed Nelson's Column
Victor Railton (1906–1996), Canadian politician

fr:Railton